Cyperus sharpei is a species of sedge that is native to north eastern parts of the Australia.

See also 
 List of Cyperus species

References 

sharpei
Plants described in 2009
Flora of Queensland